Journey to the Center of the Circle is a 1981 fantasy role-playing game adventure published by Wilmark Dynasty.

Contents
Journey to the Center of the Circle is an adventure in which a party is sent to a legendary shrine of Good in response to a request for help.

Reception
Lewis Pulsipher reviewed Journey to the Center of the Circle in The Space Gamer No. 49. Pulsipher commented that "With some tough editing, this module might have been worth publication in a magazine as an example of an unusual approach to FRP. But as a separate module it is as overpriced as Burgundy Pit, and is otherwise not equal to the Pit'''s modest standard. Unless you're really sold on the idea of halls of testing, save your money."

Reviews
 Different Worlds'' #21 (June, 1982)

References

Fantasy role-playing game adventures
Role-playing game supplements introduced in 1981